Hoàng Anh Tuấn (born 12 February 1985 in Bắc Ninh Province) is a Vietnamese weightlifter.

At the 2005 Junior World Championships, he won the silver medal in the men's -56 kg class, with a total of 276 kg. He participated in the men's -56 kg class at the 2005 World Weightlifting Championships and won the bronze medal, with a total of 279 kg.

Tuấn participated in the men’s -56 kg class at the 2006 World Weightlifting Championships and won the bronze medal, finishing behind Li Zheng and Sergio Álvarez Boulet. He snatched 124 kg and jerked an additional 152 kg for a total of 276 kg, 4 kg behind winner Li.

He also won a silver medal at the 2006 Asian Games, at 56 kg, lifting 128 kg in the snatch and 157 kg in the clean and jerk, for a total of 285 kg.

At the 2008 Asian Weightlifting Championships, he won the gold medal in the men's -56 kg class, with a total of 279 kg.

He won a silver medal at the 2008 Summer Olympics after lifting a total of 290 kg.

In some weightlifting statistics, he appears misspelled as "Anh Tuan Hoang".

Hoàng Anh Tuấn was named 2008 Vietnam Sportsman of the Year.

From 18 September 2010, he was handed a two year ban for testing positive with oxilofrine, a substance banned by World Anti-Doping Agency in competitive sports.

After retiring from competitive weightlifting, he became a coach, training his fellow athletes to participate in international competitions such as Asian Games.

References

External links
 

Vietnamese male weightlifters
1985 births
Living people
Weightlifters at the 2008 Summer Olympics
Olympic weightlifters of Vietnam
Olympic silver medalists for Vietnam
Place of birth missing (living people)
Olympic medalists in weightlifting
Asian Games medalists in weightlifting
Weightlifters at the 2006 Asian Games
Medalists at the 2008 Summer Olympics
People from Bắc Ninh province
Asian Games silver medalists for Vietnam
Medalists at the 2006 Asian Games
Southeast Asian Games bronze medalists for Vietnam
Southeast Asian Games silver medalists for Vietnam
Southeast Asian Games medalists in weightlifting
Competitors at the 2007 Southeast Asian Games
World Weightlifting Championships medalists
21st-century Vietnamese people